

The Preiss RHJ-7 is a side-by-side two-seat flapped glider developed by Preiss from a Schreder HP-14. The design used standard HP-14 wings with a 2 ft (0.6 m) center section added to the fuselage, V-tail, fixed undercarriage and a single control stick between the seats. The RHJ-7 first flew in 1966 and was the starting point for the RHJ-8 and RHJ-9 variants, also homebuilts.

Specifications

References
Sailplane Directory

1960s United States sailplanes
Glider aircraft
Aircraft first flown in 1966
V-tail aircraft